Anché is the name of the following communes in France:

 Anché, Indre-et-Loire, in the Indre-et-Loir department
 Anché, Vienne, in the Vienne department